David Neligan (14 October 1899 – 1983), known by his soubriquet "The Spy in the Castle", was a crucial figure involved in the Irish War of Independence (1919–21) and subsequently became Director of Intelligence for the Irish Army after the Irish Civil War (1922–23).

Early life
David Neligan was born 14 October 1899 at Templeglantine, Limerick where his parents, David and Elizabeth Neligan (née Mullan), were primary school teachers. He was an accomplished hurler with his local Templeglantine GAA Club. In 1917 Neligan joined the military organisation established in 1913 by Irish nationalists - the Irish Volunteers.

Dublin Metropolitan Police & MI5
Against his father's wishes, Neligan joined the Dublin Metropolitan Police (DMP) - also in 1917. Picking up travel documentation from the local Royal Irish Constabulary barracks he declined a suggestion that he enlist in this armed rural force. After service as a uniformed constable with the DMP, Neligan was promoted to Detective and transferred into the Department's widely hated counterintelligence and anti-political-subversion unit, the G Division, in 1919. In May 1920 Neligan's elder brother Maurice (1895–1920), an Irish Republican Army (IRA) member and friend of Michael Collins, persuaded him to resign from the DMP.

After his resignation, Neligan returned to his native County Limerick with the intention of doing the Limerick IRA. Shortly afterward his brother Maurice was killed in a motorcycle accident, near their home in Templeglantine. In the meantime, Neligan also received word from a family friend that Michael Collins wished to meet with him in Dublin. Collins had been outraged that Neligan had been allowed to resign and persuaded Neligan to rejoin the DMP as a mole for the intelligence wing of the IRA. Along with Detectives Eamon Broy and James McNamara, Neligan acted as a highly valuable agent for Collins and passed on reams of vital information. Neligan leaked documents about the relative importance of police and military personnel and also warned insurgents of upcoming raids and ambushes. Unconfirmed rumors were that Neligan might have been a double agent working for British interests, can now be dismissed as smear campaign owing to his subsequent service on behalf of the Irish Free State.

In 1921 Collins ordered Neligan to let himself be recruited into MI5 and he used the opportunity to memorise their passwords and the identities of their agents. All of this was passed on to Collins. After Broy and McNamara were dismissed in 1921, Neligan became Collins' most important mole inside Dublin Castle.

Irish Civil War
On the outbreak of the Civil War in June 1922, Neligan joined the Irish Army in Islandbridge Barracks with the rank of Commandant, and was attached to the Dublin Guard. He was involved in the seaborne assault on Fenit and spent the remainder of the war serving as a military intelligence officer operating between Ballymullen Barracks, Tralee & Killarney. He has been accused of involvement in several atrocities including the Ballyseedy massacre and has been referred to as the "Butcher of Kerry". However, Ernie O'Malley expressed doubts as to the evidence of this. In 1923 Neligan was posted to Dublin, where he was promoted to Colonel and succeeded Diarmuid O'Hegarty as the Irish Army's Director of Intelligence.

Later life 
In 1924 Neligan handed over his post to the youthful Colonel Michael Joe Costello and took command of the DMP (which still continued as a force separate from the newly established Garda Síochána) with the rank of Chief Superintendent. The next year he transferred to the Garda when the two police forces were amalgamated, and was instrumental in the foundation of Garda Special Branch. When Éamon de Valera became head of government in 1932, his Republican followers demanded Neligan's dismissal. Instead, Neligan was transferred to an equivalent post in the Irish Civil Service. 
In June 1935 Neligan was married to fellow civil servant Sheila Maeve Rogan. 

Neligan drew pensions from the DMP, the British MI5, the Garda Síochána and the Irish Civil Service. He also received an 'Old IRA' pension through the Department of Defence.

References

Sources 
 The Spy in the Castle by David Neligan.
 Who's Who in the Irish War of Independence 1916–1921. Padraic O'Farrell, Mercier Press 1980.

Double agents
People of the Irish Civil War (Pro-Treaty side)
Garda Síochána officers
Irish Directorate of Intelligence personnel
Military personnel from County Limerick
Spies during the Irish War of Independence
1899 births
1983 deaths
National Army (Ireland) officers
Dublin Metropolitan Police officers
Irish spies